Mad About You is an American television sitcom series that has aired on NBC from September 23, 1992, to May 24, 1999. Created by Paul Reiser and Danny Jacobson, the show follows lives of the newly married Buchmans, Paul (Reiser) and Jamie (Helen Hunt).

Mad About You has garnered critical praise for its realistic portrayal of marriage and the chemistry between Reiser and Hunt. Since its debut, the series has been nominated for 34 Primetime Emmy Awards (winning twelve), 13 Golden Globe Awards (winning four), 14 American Comedy Awards (winning seven), 10 Screen Actors Guild Awards (winning one) and 17 Q Awards (winning five), among others. 

Helen Hunt stands as the most decorated cast member, winning four consecutive Emmy Awards, three Golden Globe Awards, three American Comedy Awards, three Q Awards, and a Screen Actors Guild Award for her role as Jamie Buchman, as wells as receiving the most award nominations. Guest performers on the series have also received awards and nominations, most notably Mel Brooks and Carol Burnett.

American Comedy Awards

The American Comedy Award is an annual accolade created by George Schlatter in recognition of excellence in the field of comedy, most notably in film and television. Out of 14 nominations, Mad About You won seven awards. Helen Hunt won the award for Funniest Female Performer in a TV Series (Leading Role) Network, Cable or Syndication three times from 1994 to 1996. Mel Brooks won the award for Funniest Male Guest Appearance in a TV Series in 1997 and 2000. Carol Burnett won the award for Funniest Female Guest Appearance in a TV Series in 1997 and 1998.

Emmy Awards
The Primetime Emmy Award is an annual accolade presented by the Academy of Television Arts & Sciences for outstanding achievement in American prime time television programming. The Primetime Emmy Award recognizes outstanding achievement in aspects such as acting, writing, and direction while the more technical aspects such as cinematography, casting and, as of 2011, guest acting performances in television, are awarded at the Creative Arts Emmy Awards. During its tenure, Mad About You received 34 nominations, winning twelve of them. Helen Hunt received a nomination for Outstanding Lead Actress in a Comedy Series for every season the show was on air, winning four consecutive times from 1996 to 1999. Cyndi Lauper and Carol Burnett won the award for Outstanding Guest Actress in a Comedy Series in 1995 and 1997, respectively. Carl Reiner won the award for Outstanding Guest Actor in a Comedy Series in 1995 while Mel Brooks won the award in 1997, 1998 and 1999.

Primetime Emmy Awards

Creative Arts Emmy Awards

Golden Globe Awards
Presented since 1949, the Golden Globe Award is an annual accolade awarded by the Hollywood Foreign Press Association for outstanding achievements in film and television. Mad About You received 13 nominations during its tenure, winning three awards for Best Actress in a Television Series – Musical or Comedy, awarded to Helen Hunt, and the award for Best Television Series – Musical or Comedy in 1995.

Online Film & Television Association

Satellite Awards
The Satellite Award is an annual accolade bestowed by the International Press Academy since 1997 in recognition of outstanding achievements in film, television and new media. Mad About You received various nominations, including Best Television Series – Musical or Comedy and Best Actress – Television Series Musical or Comedy for Helen Hunt.

Screen Actors Guild Awards
The Screen Actors Guild Award is an annual accolade presented by the Screen Actors Guild‐American Federation of Television and Radio Artists (SAG-AFTRA) for outstanding individual and ensemble performances in film and television. Helen Hunt won the award for Outstanding Performance by a Female Actor in a Comedy Series in 1995 while receiving nominations for the award in 1996, 1997 and 1998. The cast of Mad About received nominations for Outstanding Performance by an Ensemble in a Comedy Series from 1995-1998.

Viewers for Quality Television Awards

The Q Award, presented by the Viewers for Quality Television, honors programs and performers that the organization deem are of the highest quality. Out of 17 nominations, Mad About You won five awards, including Best Quality Comedy Series in 1994; Best Actress in a Quality Comedy Series for Helen Hunt in 1994, 1996 and 1997; and Best Actor in a Quality Comedy Series for Paul Reiser in 1994.

Other awards

References

Mad About You